The 2013–14 season was Plymouth Argyle's 87th in the Football League and eighth in the fourth division of English football.

Current squad

Last updated: 29 October 2014Source:Greens on Screen

Pre-season

Matches

Last updated: 29 October 2014Source:Greens on Screen

League Two

League table

Result Summary

Last updated: 02 October 2014Source:

Matches

Last updated: 29 October 2013 2014Source:Greens on Screen

FA Cup

Matches

Last updated: 29 October 2014Source:Greens on Screen

League Cup

Matches

Last updated: 29 October 2014Source:Greens on Screen

Football League Trophy

Matches

Last updated: 29 October 2014Source:Greens on Screen

Kit

|
|

Appearance / Goals / Disciplinary 

Last updated: 29 October 2014Source:Greens on Screen

Transfers

Contracts

In

Loans In

Out

References

External links
Greens on Screen

Plymouth Argyle F.C. seasons
Plymouth Argyle